Mansoor Al-Balochi (Arabic:منصور البلوشي; born 18 March 1991) is an Emirati footballer. He currently plays as a midfielder for Dibba Al Fujairah on loan from Ittihad Kalba.

References

External links
 

Emirati footballers
1991 births
Living people
Al-Ittihad Kalba SC players
Ajman Club players
Al-Shaab CSC players
Dibba FC players
UAE First Division League players
UAE Pro League players
Emirati people of Baloch descent
Association football midfielders